Dirtymouth is a 1970 American biographic film of the comic Lenny Bruce, starring Bernie Travis and written and directed by Herbert S. Altman.

After Altman completed the film, it was the subject of a lawsuit by film producer Marvin Worth.  Worth had obtained the film rights in two books written by Bruce, and he alleged that Altman's movie infringed the copyrights in those books. The court agreed that some of the content in the film was copyright infringement, and issued a preliminary injunction.  Travis had also starred as Bruce in a stage production at The Village Gate in Greenwich Village; that production was also the subject of a copyright lawsuit by the executors of Bruce's estate.

The film eventually received some small critical attention before being eclipsed by Worth's much more famous 1974 film production Lenny, directed by Bob Fosse and starring Dustin Hoffman.

See also
 List of American films of 1970

References

External links

1970 films
American biographical films
Biographical films about entertainers
Cultural depictions of Lenny Bruce
Works about comedians
1970s English-language films
1970s American films